Thermo (before 1915: Κεφαλόβρυσον Kefalovryson) is a town and a municipality in Aetolia-Acarnania, Greece. It is located in the southeastern part of the regional unit, largely between Lake Trichonida (the largest natural lake in Greece) and the southern border of Evrytania.

Its municipal seat is the town of Thermo (pop. 1,959). Its largest other towns are Analipsis (pop. 734), Petrochori (444), Sitaralona (664), Myrtea (729), and Koniska (326). The nearby village of Mega Dendron was the birthplace of Cosmas of Aetolia.

Thermo took its name from the ancient city Thermos, that was located near the present town.

Subdivisions

The municipality Thermo consists of the following communities:
Thermo (Thermo, Koulouria, Mandra, Marathos, Megas Dendros, Taxiarchis)
Avarikos (Avarikos, Pini)
Agia Sofia (Agia Sofia, Mavrovoros, Pournara)
Aetopetra
Amvrakia
Analipsis (Analipsis, Kaimena Ampelia, Koftra, Marathoula, Paliouria)
Argyro Pigadi (Argyro Pigadi, Theotokos)
Diasellaki
Diplatanos
Drymon (Drymon, Agia Triada, Ano Drymon, Koskinas)
Kaloudi (Kaloudi, Dounaiika, Marathias)
Kato Chrysovitsa (Kato Chrysovitsa, Diasello, Dosoula, Koutsomilia)
Kokkinovrysi (Ampelia, Agios Theodoros, Kokkinovrysi)
Koniska (Koniska, Agios Ioannis, Poulinos)
Lefko
Myrtea (Myrtea, Loutra, Palaiomylos, Perevos)
Nerochori (Nerochori, Meligkova, Misampella)
Pamfi
Perkos
Petrochori (Petrochori, Prionaiika)
Sitaralona
Chaliki Amvrakias (Dafni, Ladikou, Nerosyrtis, Chaliki)
Chrysovitsa (Chrysovitsa, Dokimia, Roggia)

See also
Thermos (Aetolia) archaeological site
Aetolian League

References

External links
Municipality of Thermo 

Municipalities of Western Greece
Populated places in Aetolia-Acarnania